Vesyoly is a rural locality (a khutor) in Prokhorovsky District, Belgorod Oblast, Russia. The population was 123 as of 2010. There are 2 streets.

Geography 
Vesyoly is located 17 km west of Prokhorovka (the district's administrative centre) by road. Kostroma is the nearest rural locality.

References 

Rural localities in Prokhorovsky District